"Tiempo" is a 1994 single by German synthpop band Cetu Javu taken from their second album Where Is Where.

Track listings

12" vinyl
 SPA: Modermusic / EP-1002-M

References

1994 singles
Cetu Javu songs
1992 songs